

Executive power

President of the French Republic
Government of France
Ministers of France

Legislative power

French Congress of Parliament
French National Assembly
French Senate

Judicial power

Constitutional Council of France
Council of magistrature

See also
List of German institutions
Portal:France
Portal:Politics
Politics of France

Institutions
French institutions
Institutions